Maurice Cass (October 12, 1884 – June 8, 1954) was a character actor on stage and in films and television shows.

Born in Vilna, Russian Empire (modern day Vilnius, Lithuania) he moved to America at six years of age. When he was 17, he toured the southern United States with a repertory company.

His slight build, frizzy hair and pince-nez glasses cast him as the "absent minded professor" or eccentric scientist type in many of his films, such as the character who discovers the element kryptonite in Adventures of Superman.

He is best remembered for his role as Professor Newton in the 1954 TV science fiction show Rocky Jones, Space Ranger, which later was produced as a filmManhunt in Space.

Cass's Broadway credits included The Sky's the Limit (1934), Broadway Boy (1932), Wild Waves (1932), Wonder Boy (1931), Overture (1930), The Violet and One, Two, Three (1930), The Novice and the Duke (1929), The Broken Chain (1929), and Faust (1928).

He died of a heart attack at age 69 while the Rocky Jones show was still in production; his Professor Newton character was replaced by a new character, Professor Mayberry.

Selected filmography

 Two for Tonight (1935)
 Arbor Day (1936)
 Charlie Chan at the Opera (1936) (Stage Manager—Mr. Arnold)
 Wife, Doctor and Nurse (1937) - Pompout
 Women of Glamour (1937)
 She Had to Eat (1937)
 The Lady Escapes (1937)
 Exiled to Shanghai (1937)
 The Jones Family in Big Business (1937)
 The Lone Wolf in Paris (1938)
 Josette (1938)
 The Baroness and the Butler (1938)
 Second Fiddle (1939)
 Rose of Washington Square (1939)
 Sunset Trail (1939)
 Pier 13 (1940)
 Her Lucky Night (1945)
 Paris Underground (1945)
 She Gets Her Man (1945)
 High Conquest (1947)
 Once More, My Darling (1949)
 The Go-Getter (1956)

References

External links
 
 
 

1884 births
1954 deaths
People from Vilna Governorate
American male actors
American people of Lithuanian-Jewish descent
Emigrants from the Russian Empire to the United States
Burials at Hollywood Forever Cemetery
American male stage actors